The West Virginia State Yellow Jackets (also WVSU) are the athletic teams that represent West Virginia State University, located in Institute, West Virginia, in NCAA Division II intercollegiate sports. The Yellow Jackets compete as members of the Mountain East Conference for all ten varsity sports. West Virginia State was a founding member of the conference following the demise of the West Virginia Intercollegiate Athletic Conference in 2013. WVSU's main rival is the University of Charleston (WV).

Varsity teams

History
During the segregation era, the school competed in athletics as "West Virginia" and played other segregated schools as a member of the Colored Intercollegiate Athletic Association. After desegregation, the school withdrew from the CIAA (today's Central Intercollegiate Athletic Association) and competed as "West Virginia State" to avoid confusion with West Virginia University. The school then moved to the formerly all-white West Virginia Intercollegiate Athletic Conference, which competed in the NCAA's Division II. After the dissolution of the WVIAC, WVSU joined the new Mountain East Conference in 2013, which is part of Division II.

During the segregation era, black high schools were barred from competition in the West Virginia Secondary School Activities Commission, and State therefore sponsored an unofficial "state colored championship" from 1932 to 1959.

List of teams

Men's sports
 Baseball
 Basketball
 Cross Country 
 Football
 Golf
 Indoor Track 
 Outdoor Track 
 Tennis

Women's sports
 Acrobatics & Tumbling 
 Basketball
 Cross Country 
 Indoor Track 
 Outdoor Track 
 Soccer
 Softball
 Tennis
 Volleyball

Individual sports

Football

The football team was ranked in the NCAA's Division II Football Poll in 2008.  They played in the Chicago Football Classic, which is for HBCU colleges and universities, at Chicago's Soldier Field in 2008.  They defeated the Marauders of Central State University.  The Yellow Jackets football team has also played in the Palmetto Capital City Classic against Benedict College and the Dayton Classic against Central State.  In December 2012, Jon Anderson was named the 13th head football coach in Yellow Jackets history. Anderson came to WVSU after serving on the coaching staff of NAIA football powerhouse the University of Sioux Falls (USF). During Anderson's time on the coaching staff at USF, the school won three NAIA national championships.

Accolades
Other accolades of the Yellow Jackets athletic teams include the men's basketball team ranking #24 in the U.S. on the NCAA's Division II preseason top 25 bulletin for 2009–10, the men's baseball team receiving the WVIAC Sportsmanship Award for 2008–09, the women's cheerleading squad taking third place for the WVIAC Presidents' Cup in 2007–08, the women's golf team finishing sixth place at the WVIAC Women's Golf Championship in 2009, and the 2009 WVIAC Coach Poll ranking the WVSU women's volleyball team at number 2 for the start of the 2009 season.

Notable Basketball Players
 Earl Lloyd

Notes

References

External links